Mayfair is a Metra station located on the Milwaukee District North Line on the border between the Albany Park and Portage Park community areas of Chicago, Illinois. The station is officially located at 4357 North Cicero Avenue (Illinois Route 50), however the actual location is the northeast corner of West Pensacola and North Kilpatrick Avenues. In Metra's zone-based fare system, Mayfair is in zone B. As of 2018, Mayfair is the 147th busiest of Metra's 236 non-downtown stations, with an average of 281 weekday boardings.

As of December 12, 2022, Mayfair is served by 40 trains (19 inbound, 21 outbound) on weekdays, by all 20 trains (10 in each direction) on Saturdays, and by all 18 trains (nine in each direction) on Sundays and holidays.

Transfers are available to the Blue Line at the nearby Montrose Avenue station, as well as CTA's bus system. Although the line does have an at-grade junction with Union Pacific Northwest Line just north of the station platforms, there are no direct connections from here to any of the Union Pacific Northwest Line's stops within Albany Park.

Bus and rail connections
CTA Blue Line
Montrose

CTA Buses
  54 Cicero 
  54A North Cicero/Skokie Blvd 
  78 Montrose

References

External links

Flickr images
Montrose Avenue entrance from Google Maps Street View

Metra stations in Chicago
Former Chicago, Milwaukee, St. Paul and Pacific Railroad stations
Railway stations in the United States opened in 1896